Javier Bedoya de Vivanco (born 23 September 1948 in Lima) is a Peruvian lawyer and politician (PPC) and a former Congressman representing Lima between 2006 and 2016.

Early life 
Born in Lima on 23 September 1948 to Luis Bedoya Reyes. His father, Luis is the founder of the Christian People's Party and was Mayor of Lima, member of the lower house of the Peruvian Congress and Minister of Justice, among others. He is a member of the Bedoya family, often compared in Peru with the Kennedy family because of its extensive and continuous commitment to public service.

Career 
Bedoya is also a lawyer who is partner of Bedoya Law Firm (Estudio Bedoya Abogados). Bedoya Law Firm has attorneys with a wide experience in the provision of corporate counseling services in Civil, Trade, Financial, Industrial Property, Tax and Labor Law, Commercial, Constitutional, Administrative, Civil Procedural and Municipal Law.

Political career

Early political career 
Bedoya's first political office was councilor of Lima from 1980 to 1983. From 1983 to 1986 Bedoya acted as the sub-secretary of the Lima Province-PPC.

Congressional career

Deputy 
In the 1985 election, he was elected to the Chamber of Deputies under the Democratic Convergence alliance and in the 1990 election, he was re-elected for a second term, this time under the FREDEMO list, his term ended when the Congress was dissolved in 1992 due to President Alberto Fujimori's self-coup. In 1989, he was also promoted to Secretary General on the national level of his party, a position he held until 1992 as well.

Congressman 
In the 2006 election he was elected to the now unicameral Congress on the National Unity list for the 2006–11 term. In the 2011 election he was re-elected on the ticket of the Alliance for the Great Change to which the Christian Democrats now belong. In the 2016 election, he ran for re-election under the Popular Alliance which group the Christian Democrats and the Peruvian Aprista Party, but lost his seat. He ran for the Presidency of the Congress in 2014, but he lost to Ana María Solórzano.

External links

Official Congressional Site
Resume on the National Electoral Committee (JNE) site

Living people
1948 births
Peruvian people of Spanish descent
National Unity (Peru) politicians
Members of the Congress of the Republic of Peru
20th-century Peruvian lawyers

Christian People's Party (Peru) politicians
Pontifical Catholic University of Peru alumni
People from Lima
21st-century Peruvian lawyers